Tephris verruculella is a species of moth in the family Pyralidae. It was described by Ragonot in 1887. It is found in Russia (Transcausia), Morocco and Israel.

References

Moths described in 1887
Phycitini
Moths of Europe
Moths of Africa
Moths of the Middle East